Jean Dunlop Cadell (13 September 1884 – 29 September 1967) was a Scottish character actress. Although her married name was Jean Dunlop Perceval-Clark she retained her maiden name in the context of acting.

Life and career

She was born at 4 Buckingham Terrace in Edinburgh, the daughter of Dr Francis Cadell (1844-1909), a wealthy surgeon, and his wife, Mary Hamilton Boileau (1853-1907). The family moved to 22 Ainslie Place, a huge Georgian house on the Moray Estate, in her youth.

She performed in the cinema and on the stage. Among her best-known cinema roles was in the Ealing Studios comedy Whisky Galore! (1949), as well as Pygmalion (1938) and I Know Where I'm Going! (1945). She once performed opposite W.C. Fields in Hollywood, cast as Mrs. Micawber to his Wilkins Micawber in Metro-Goldwyn-Mayer's 1935 production of David Copperfield. Although Cadell remains in the released version of the film, her biggest scene (when the Micawber family prepare to emigrate) was deleted from the release prints.

Jean Cadell died in London on 29 September 1967, aged 83.

She is buried with her family in Dean Cemetery in western Edinburgh. The grave lies against the southern wall.

Family

Her brother, Francis Cadell, was one of the Scottish Colourists. She married actor Perceval Perceval-Clark. Jean and Perceval both appeared in the play The Man Who Stayed at Home.

Her son, born John Cadell Perceval-Clark in 1915, changed his name to John Cadell and became a theatrical agent. Her grandson Simon Cadell and her granddaughter Selina Cadell also became actors.

Complete filmography

David Garrick (1912, Short) - Araminta Brown
The Man Who Stayed at Home (1915) - Miss Myrtle
Anna the Adventuress (1920) - Nellie Bates
Alf's Button (1920) - Vicar's wife
The Naked Man (1923) - Miss Linnett
The Loves of Robert Burns (1930) - Mrs. Burns
Escape (1930) - (uncredited)
Two White Arms (1932) - Mrs. Drury
Fires of Fate (1932) - Miss Byrne
Timbuctoo (1933) - Wilhelmina
The Luck of a Sailor (1934) - Princess Rosanna
Little Friend (1934) - Miss Drew
David Copperfield (1935) - Mrs. Micawber
Whom the Gods Love (1936) - Frau Mozart
Love from a Stranger (1937) - Aunt Lou
South Riding (1938) - Miss Dry
Tobias and the Angel (1938, TV Movie) - Anna
Pygmalion (1938) - Mrs. Pearce
Suspect (1939, TV Movie) - Goudie Macintyre
Confidential Lady (1940) - Amy Boswell
Quiet Wedding (1941) - Aunt Florence
The Young Mr. Pitt (1942) - Mrs. Sparry
Dear Octopus (1943) - Vicar's Wife
Two Girls and a Sailor (1944) - Mrs. Church
I Know Where I'm Going! (1945) - Postmistress
Jassy (1947) - Meggie
Afterglow (1948, TV Movie) - Frau Kaunitz
That Dangerous Age (1949) - Nannie
Marry Me! (1949) - Hester Parsons
Whisky Galore! (1949) - Mrs. Campbell
No Place for Jennifer (1950) - Aunt Jacqueline
Madeleine (1950) - Mrs. Jenkins
Craven House (1950, TV Movie) - Miss HattThe Reluctant Widow (1950) - Mrs. BarrowsThe Switchback (1950, TV Movie) - Aunt DinahThe Late Edwina Black (1951) - EllenMusic at Night (1952, TV Movie) - Mrs. AmesburyI'm a Stranger (1952) - Hannah MackenzieThree's Company (1953) - Miss Craig (segment "Take a Number' story)Meet Mr. Lucifer (1953) - Mrs. MacdonaldThe Whiteoak Chronicles: The Building of Jalna (1955, TV Movie) - Adeline WhiteoakThe Whiteoak Chronicles: Whiteoaks (1955, TV Movie) - Adeline WhiteoakKeep It Clean (1956) - Mrs. Edgar AnsteyThe Druid Circle (1957, TV Movie) - Mrs. WhiteThe Little Hut (1957) - Mrs. Hermione Brittingham-BrettLet's Be Happy (1957) - Mrs. Cathie (uncredited)The Surgeon's Knife (1957) - Henrietta StevensDoomsday for Dyson (1959, TV Movie) - Great Aunt LucyRockets Galore! (1958) - Mrs. CampbellSerious Charge (1959) - Almshouse MatronUpstairs and Downstairs (1959) - 1st Old LadyA Taste of Money (1961) - Miss BrillVery Important Person'' (1961) - Lady Telling Story on TV show. Opening Scene

References

External links

1884 births
1967 deaths
Actresses from Edinburgh
Scottish stage actresses
Scottish film actresses
Scottish silent film actresses
20th-century Scottish actresses